Ernest Lytton Leslie Forwood (3 October 1915 – 18 May 1988), known professionally as Anthony Forwood, was an English actor.

Early life
Ernest Lytton Leslie Forwood was born on 3 October 1915 in Weymouth, England. The Forwood family were landed gentry; Forwood's great-grandfather, Thomas Friend Brittain Peploe Forwood, resided in Thornton Manor in Cheshire and was the forefather of the Forwood Baronetcy. Forwood's great-uncles were English merchants, shipowners and politicians Sir Arthur Forwood, 1st Baronet and Sir William Bower Forwood; his father was Leslie Langton Forwood, a captain in the Royal Navy.

Career
After years of theatre, including the revue This World of Ours in 1935; Forwood gained his first film acting role in 1949, when he starred in Ralph Thomas' Traveller's Joy. That same year he appeared in the thriller The Man in Black with Sid James.

In 1952, he received a number of roles including Appointment in London with Dirk Bogarde; he eventually became his longtime partner and manager. Ralph Thomas, who had directed Forwood in his first film role, directed Bogarde in Doctor in the House and several of its sequels.

Forwood appeared with Boris Karloff in the mystery Colonel March Investigates and played Will Scarlet in The Story of Robin Hood and His Merrie Men (1952). One year later he acted in the Oscar-nominated Knights of the Round Table, a film starring such high-profile actors as Robert Taylor, Ava Gardner and Stanley Baker, and in Terence Fisher’s Mantrap (1953). His last role came in 1956 in Colonel March of Scotland Yard.

Personal life
In 1942, Forwood married actress Glynis Johns but they divorced in 1948. Their only child was actor Gareth Forwood (1945–2007).

Anthony Forwood later lived with his long-term partner actor Dirk Bogarde in Amersham, England and then in France until shortly before his death in London in 1988.

Death
By 1987, Forwood was dying of liver cancer and Parkinson's disease. At this time Bogarde, a heavy smoker, had a minor stroke. On 18 May 1988, Forwood died aged 72 in Kensington and Chelsea, London. His body was cremated.

Filmography

References

Citations

General and cited sources

External links
 

1915 births
1988 deaths
Deaths from cancer in England
Deaths from liver cancer
Deaths from Parkinson's disease
Neurological disease deaths in England
Bisexual male actors
English LGBT actors
Actors from Amersham
Male actors from Dorset
Male actors from Buckinghamshire
20th-century English male actors
British male stage actors
British male film actors
20th-century English LGBT people